EMPORDEF, SGPS, SA (Portuguese Defense Company) was a holding company, created in March 1997, owned by the Portuguese government which manages other companies directly or indirectly connected to the defense sector, such as telecommunications, information technology, engineering, aeronautical construction and shipbuilding. In January, 2020, it was announced that the Portuguese government had completed the liquidation of the company. The remainder of its assets were transferred to idD - Plataforma das Indústrias de Defesa Nacionais.

Participated companies 
 OGMA (35% ownership) - Aeronautical industry.
 IDD (100%) - Demilitarization of defense materiel.
 EMPORDEF-TI (100%) - Simulation, training, test and maintenance support systems. 
 EID (38.57%) - Communication systems.
 Edisoft (17.5%) - Weapon control, information integration, military logistics, collective security and space systems.
 DEFAERLOC (100%) - C-295 leasing company
 DEFLOC (81%) - EH-101 leasing company
 Naval Rocha (45%) - Shipbuilding industry.
 Arsenal do Alfeite (100%) - Shipbuilding industry.
 OGMA Imobiliária, S.A. (100%) - Real estate.
 EEN (100%) - Naval engineering.
 Ribeira d’Atalaia – Sociedade Imobiliária, S.A. (57%) - Real estate.
 ENVC (100%) - Shipbuilding industry.
 INDEP (100%) - Weapons and ammunition.

See also 
 Portuguese Armed Forces
 Portuguese Air Force
 European Defence Agency
 European Space Agency
 Leasing
 Offset agreement
 Foreign Military Sales
 Portuguese Pandur
 Critical Software
 Rohde & Schwarz

References

Bibliography

External links 
 EMPORDEF, official website 
 EMPORDEF - Empresa Portuguesa de Defesa, SGPS,SA

Military corporations
Government-owned companies of Portugal